is a Japanese manga series written and illustrated by Daisuke Yui. It began serialization online via Flex Comix's Comic Meteor website in 2012 and has since been collected into two tankōbon volumes. An anime television series adaptation by Asahi Production and Production Reed aired from October to December 2015.

Characters

Hakone is the hot spring spirit enshrined at the well in Tōya's backyard. She was awakened when he wished for a favorable fortune with Haruna, with whom he has a crush on her. Since she is weakened from her long slumber, she takes the form of a little girl. She regains her full adult form when her powers are fully recharged. She is also endowed with a magical yosegi puzzle box she sometimes use. She is later hired by the local association of hot spring owners to be their ambassador.

Tōya is in charge of cleaning the well, where Hakone is enshrined, in their backyard. He awakened Hakone when, after wishing for a favorable fortune with Haruna, he accidentally dropped his offering of a steamed bun into the well. His family also owns a steamed bun factory.

Miya is the second hot spring spirit to awaken, she being the spirit of the Miyanoshita Hot Springs. Hakone's archrival is dressed in a Gothic outfit and speaks in a refined manner. She owns the new hot spring resort hotel in the neighborhood. She is also endowed with magical puzzle box. She aims to battle Hakone at first, but given the threat of the new hot spring spirits, she joins forces with her. She also has a crush on Tōya, partly due to Hakone's magic unleashed on her.

Haruna's family owns the Shunjusou, a hot spring hotel near Tōya's place. Tōya has a crush on her, and Hakone is helping him win her over, though she is older than him. Despite her calm demeanor, there is a side of her that is so strict everyone is scared of it. She also later shows that side whenever Tōya is cavorting with another girl.

Fourteen year-old Aki is Haruna's younger sister who would tag along with her, Tōya, and Hakone on the latter's quest to regain her powers.

Gōra is the spirit of Gōra Park, and, along with Ashinoko, aims to dominate the hot springs in the area. She is dressed in a kimono quite similar to that of Sakura Shinguji.

Ashinoko, the guardian of Ashinoko Shrine, is another new hot spring spirit who helps Gōra to dominate the hot springs in the area. She wears a sailor uniform.

Media

Anime
An anime television adaptation by Asahi Production aired from October 2015 to December 2015.

Episode list

References

External links
  

2015 anime television series debuts
Anime series based on manga
Asahi Production
Ashi Productions
Comedy anime and manga
Comic Meteor manga
Japanese webcomics
Shinto kami in anime and manga
Shōnen manga
Webcomics in print